John Taddeus Heard (October 29, 1840 – January 27, 1927) was a Democratic Representative representing Missouri from March 4, 1885, to March 3, 1895.

Heard was born in Georgetown, Missouri, in Pettis County, Missouri. He graduated from the University of Missouri in 1860. He was admitted to the bar in 1862 and practiced law in Sedalia, Missouri. He was a member of the Missouri State House of Representatives in 1872–1875; Missouri State Senate in 1880–1884; employed in 1881 by the fund commissioners of the State to prosecute and adjust all claims of the State against the General Government. While in Congress he was chairman, Committee on District of Columbia (Fifty-third Congress); unsuccessful candidate for reelection in 1894 to the Fifty-fourth Congress; delegate to the 1904 Democratic National Convention.

He died on January 27, 1927, while on a visit to Los Angeles, California. He is buried in Crown Hill Cemetery in Sedalia.

The John T. and Lillian Heard House at Sedalia was listed on the National Register of Historic Places in 2011.

References

1840 births
1927 deaths
People from Sedalia, Missouri
People from Pettis County, Missouri
University of Missouri alumni
Democratic Party members of the Missouri House of Representatives
Democratic Party Missouri state senators
Democratic Party members of the United States House of Representatives from Missouri